Francesco Nomicisi (died 1507) was a Roman Catholic prelate who served as Bishop of Lesina (1504–1507).

Biography
On 29 April 1504, Francesco Nomicisi was appointed during the papacy of Pope Julius II as Bishop of Lesina.
He served as Bishop of Lesina until his death in 1507.

References 

16th-century Italian Roman Catholic bishops
Bishops appointed by Pope Julius II
1507 deaths